Tartar was an unsuccessful American privateer schooner during the War of 1812. She was launched in 1813 and was driven ashore and destroyed on her maiden voyage at the end of the year, not having captured anything.

Tartar was launched in late 1813 and reportedly cost her owners $50,000. Captain Edward Veazy (or Veasey, or Veazey) took command a few days after 9 November, and received his letter of marque one month later. She had been out two weeks when a fierce storm on 20 December drove her aground on an off-shore bank near Cape Henry, Virginia. Six of her crew froze to death before the survivors could reach shore the next morning.

American accounts report that Royal Navy brigs came up on the morning of the 22nd and started firing on the survivors on shore and the two companies of Virginia militia that had arrived on the scene. By evening the Americans could no longer hold off the British, who sent in boats to destroy Tartar. British records credit the 74-gun , Captain Robert Barrie, with destroying her on 22 December.

Notes

Citations

References
 
 
 

1813 ships
Privateer ships of the United States
Maritime incidents in 1813